Last Light is a 1993 American film starring Forest Whitaker, Kiefer Sutherland and Clancy Brown. It was Sutherland's directorial debut.

Plot
The film is about a prisoner awaiting execution. Denver Bayliss (Kiefer Sutherland) gains an unlikely friend and confidant in Fred Whitmore (Forest Whitaker), a former cop who is now a prison guard. Whitmore's life is a mess, as he shuts out his wife and cannot relate to his son. As Bayliss's execution draws nearer, Whitmore clashes more and more with Lt. McMannis (Clancy Brown), his supervisor, over Bayliss's treatment. Bayliss gives Whitmore a new understanding of life by helping him come to terms with a traumatic past, and Whitmore helps Bayliss to make his peace with himself and the world.

Cast
 Forest Whitaker as Fred Whitmore
 Kiefer Sutherland as Denver Bayliss
 Clancy Brown as Lt. Lionel McMannis
 Lynne Moody as Hope Whitmore
 Amanda Plummer as Lillian Burke, Denver Bayliss's sister
 Kathleen Quinlan as Kathy Rubicek
 Danny Trejo as 2nd Inmate

External links

1993 television films
1993 films
Films directed by Kiefer Sutherland
American prison films
1993 crime drama films
American crime drama films
American drama television films
1990s American films
1990s English-language films